Paul Runangaza Ruzoka (born 1948) is a Tanzanian prelate of the Catholic Church who has been Archbishop of Tabora since 25 November 2006. He has been bishop since 6 January 1990.

Biography
Archbishop Paul R. Ruzoka was born in 1948 in Nyakayenzi, Kigoma. After his studies and clerical formations, on July 20, 1975, he was ordained priest by the laying on of hands by Bishop Alphons Daniel Nsabi of the Catholic Diocese of Kigoma, being the sixth native priest of Kigoma, to be ordained priest in Kigoma. On November 10, 1989, Saint John Paul II appointed him the Bishop of the Catholic Diocese of Kigoma and was consecrated by Saint John Paul II on January 6, 1990, at St. Peter's Basilica in the Vatican City. On November 25, 2006, Pope Benedict XVI appointed him the Archbishop of Tabora Archdiocese and officially installed on January 28, 2007.

References

1948 births
Living people